Mose is an unincorporated community in Griggs County, in the U.S. state of North Dakota.

Founded in 1899, Mose is regularly known as "The Town That Blew Away" due to a large derecho which occurred on July 14, 1943.

History
A post office was established at Mose in 1904, and was in operation until 1954. Mose had approximately 30 inhabitants in the 1930s. The town was largely destroyed due to a derecho that devastated the town, causing most inhabitants to move to other towns in the area.

References

Unincorporated communities in Griggs County, North Dakota
Unincorporated communities in North Dakota